The 1968 NAIA Men's Ice Hockey Tournament involved four schools playing in single-elimination bracket to determine the national champion of men's NAIA college ice hockey. The 1968 tournament was the first men's ice hockey tournament to be sponsored by the NAIA.  The tournament began on March 8, 1968, and ended with the championship game on March 9.

The championship game pitted ICHA conference rivals Bemidji State College (BSC) and Lake Superior State College (LSSC) against each other. Despite LSSC taking all four regular season games against BSC, the Beavers earned their first National Title with a 5-4 overtime victory over the Lakers.

Brackets
St. Paul Auditorium, St. Paul, Minnesota

Note: * denotes overtime period(s)

References

External links 
 NAIA ice hockey

Ice
NAIA Men's Ice Hockey Championship
NAIA Ice Hockey Championship 
NAIA Ice Hockey Championship
Ice hockey competitions in Saint Paul, Minnesota
1960s in Minnesota